The New Jersey Marathon and Half Marathon is a set of races that take place in and around Long Branch, NJ. It started in 1997 as a revival of the Jersey Shore Marathon, which was held from 1972 to 1985. The name was changed to the New Jersey Shore Marathon in 1999, and changed again to the New Jersey Marathon in 2001. Then-governor James McGreevey declared it the official state marathon in 2005.

In its present form, the weekend of racing includes a marathon, a half-marathon, a half-marathon relay, a 5K, and several short children's races.

History

The original Jersey Shore Marathon was held from 1972 to 1985 every November, which was too close to the New York City Marathon, and the marathon dissolved in 1985 due to lack of participation and sponsorship.

In 1995, the idea of staging a world class marathon was promoted and a feasibility study showed great interest within the racing community.  By 1997, the dreams of a world class marathon returning to the Jersey Shore became a reality and the first New Jersey Marathon was held on April 27, 1997.  Over 1,000 runners registered for the race and over 800 of them finished.

In 2005, race officials were told by the governing body of Sea Bright, NJ that they could no longer use Ocean Ave., a critical section of the course, in the town for the race.  Sea Bright officials cited safety concerns as the reason for the banning of all sporting events on the road.

The race moved south to Long Branch, and the finish of the course has been there since 2006. The Long Branch half-marathon was also added in 2006.

The 2020 in-person edition of the race was cancelled due to the COVID-19 pandemic, with all registrants given the option of running the race virtually, transferring their entry to 2021, or obtaining store credit of equivalent value. The 2021 marathon was also cancelled due to COVID-19, as Long Branch refused permission for a large gathering to be hosted in the town due to concerns over Delta variant.

Course

The New Jersey Marathon starts within the parking area of Monmouth Park Racetrack in Oceanport, New Jersey. It winds its way through the residential areas of Oceanport and Monmouth Beach before turning south into Long Branch. It then continues south through the beach communities of Deal, Allenhurst, Loch Arbour, Asbury Park and Ocean Grove, mostly within a block or two of the beach itself. The final 1.7 miles is run on the Long Branch boardwalk.

The course has no significant hills and is virtually flat, outside of some gentle rolling stretches early on and several bridge crossings. It is USATF-certified, which allows runners to use the full marathon course to qualify for the following year’s Boston Marathon.

Winners 

Key:

Notes

References 

Marathons in the United States
Recurring sporting events established in 1997